The sixth season of Let's Dance began on 5 April 2013. Sylvie van der Vaart and Daniel Hartwich returned as hosts. Motsi Mabuse and Joachim Llambi returned as judges, while Jorge Gonzalez replaced Maite Kelly and Roman Frieling.

Couples

Judges scores

Red numbers indicates the lowest score for each week.
Green numbers indicates the highest score for each week.
 indicates the couple eliminated that week.
 indicates the returning couple that finished in the bottom two/three.
 indicates the winning couple.
 indicates the runner-up couple.
 indicates the third-place couple.

Averages 
This table only counts for dances scored on a traditional 30-points scale. Points from Discofox-Marathon do not count towards averages.

Highest and lowest scoring performances 
The best and worst performances in each dance according to the judges' marks are as follows:

Couples' Highest and lowest scoring performances
According to the traditional 30-point scale.

Weekly scores and songs
Unless indicated otherwise, individual judges scores in the charts below (given in parentheses) are listed in this order from left to right: Jorge Gonzalez, Motsi Mabuse and Joachim Llambi.

Week 1

Running order

Week 2

Running order

Week 3

Running order

Week 4

Running order

Week 5

Running order

Week 6 "Movie Night" 

Running order

Week 7 "Magic Moments" 

Running order

Week 8  

Running order

Week 9  

Running order

Viewers' votes: 50.06% for Manuel & Melissa, 49.94% for Sıla & Christian

Dance Chart

 Week 1: Cha-Cha-Cha or Waltz
 Week 2: Rumba or Quickstep
 Week 3: Jive or Tango
 Week 4: Paso Doble or Viennese Waltz and Discofox Marathon
 Week 5: Samba or Foxtrot and Team Rumba/Jive Dance
 Week 6: Two unlearned dances 
 Week 7: One unlearned dance and freestyle
 Week 8: Two unlearned dances and Cha-cha-cha dance-off
 Week 9: Judges' redemption dance, Couples' favorite dance and Freestyle
 

 Highest scoring dance
 Lowest scoring dance
 Danced, but not scored

Call-out order
The table below lists the order in which the contestants' fates were revealed. The order of the safe couples doesn't reflect the viewer voting results.

 This couple came in first place with the judges.
 This couple came in last place with the judges.
 This couple was eliminated.
 This couple came in last place with the judges and was eliminated.
 This couple won the competition.
 This couple came in second in the competition.
 This couple came in third in the competition.

Let's Dance (German TV series)
2013 German television seasons